Wellcom is a mobile phone and smart phone brand of NewTel Corporation that is headquartered in Bangkok, Thailand. Its markets are expanding from Thailand to the neighboring countries of Vietnam, Laos, Myanmar, and Cambodia.

Wellcom smart phones employ the Android OS.

References

External links 
 Wellcom Mobile
 Wellcom Telecom

Mobile phone companies of Thailand
Thai brands
Companies based in Bangkok